In philosophy, a theory of everything (ToE) is an ultimate, all-encompassing explanation or description of nature or reality.  Adopting the term from physics, where the search for a theory of everything is ongoing, philosophers have discussed the viability of the concept and analyzed its properties and implications.  Among the questions to be addressed by a philosophical theory of everything are: "Why is reality understandable?" – "Why are the laws of nature as they are?" – "Why is there anything at all?"

A philosophical theory of everything, would need to, as much as is possible or makes sense, unify analytic and continental philosophy. Questions such as "Why is there anything at all?" are arguably metaphysics questions and not so much related to a philosophical ToE.

Comprehensive philosophical systems

The "system building" style of metaphysics attempts to answer all the important questions in a coherent way, providing a complete picture of the world. The philosophies of Plato and Aristotle could  be said to be early examples of comprehensive systems. In the early modern period (17th and 18th centuries), the system-building scope of philosophy is often linked to the rationalist method of philosophy, that is the technique of deducing the nature of the world by pure a priori reason. Examples from the early modern period include Leibniz's monadology, Descartes's dualism, and Spinoza's monism. Hegel's absolute idealism and Whitehead's process philosophy were later systems. At present, work is underway on the structural-systematic philosophy (SSP), to which the following books are devoted: Lorenz B. Puntel, Structure and Being (2008; translation of Struktur und Sein, 2006) and Being and God (2011; translation of Sein und Gott, 2010) and Alan White, Toward a Philosophical Theory of Everything (2014). The SSP makes no claims to finality; it aims to be the best systematic philosophy currently available.

Other philosophers do not believe philosophy should aim so high. Some scientists think a more mathematical approach than philosophy is needed for a ToE, for instance Stephen Hawking wrote in A Brief History of Time that even if we had a ToE, it would necessarily be a set of equations. He wrote, "What is it that breathes fire into the equations and makes a universe for them to describe?"

Nicholas Rescher

Properties and impasse of self-substantiation 
In "The Price of an Ultimate Theory", originally published in 2000, Nicholas Rescher specifies what he sees as the principal properties of a Theory of Everything and describes an apparent impasse on the road to such a theory.

Properties

Principle of sufficient reason 

First, he takes as a presupposition the principle of sufficient reason, which in his formulation states that every fact t has an explanation t:

where E predicates explanation, so that t' E t denotes "t''' explains t".

 Comprehensiveness 

Next, he asserts that the most direct and natural construction of a Theory of Everything T* would confer upon it two crucial features: comprehensiveness and finality.  Comprehensiveness says that wherever there is a fact t, T* affords its explanation:

 Finality 

Finality says that as an "ultimate theory", T* has no deeper explanation:

so that the only conceivable explanation of T* is T* itself.

 Noncircularity 

Rescher notes that it is obviously problematic to deploy a theory for its own explanation; at the heart of the traditional conception of explanatory adequacy, he says, is a principle of noncircularity stating that no fact can explain itself:

 Impasse 

The impasse is then that the two critical aspects of a Theory of Everything, comprehensiveness and finality, conflict with the fundamental principle of noncircularity.  A comprehensive theory which explains everything must explain itself, and a final theory which has no deeper explanation must, by the principle of sufficient reason, have some explanation; consequently it too must be self-explanatory.  Rescher concludes that any Theorist of Everything committed to comprehensiveness and finality is bound to regard noncircularity as "something that has to be jettisoned".  But how, he asks, can a theory adequately substantiate itself?

 Ways forward 

Rescher's proposal in "The Price of an Ultimate Theory" is to dualize the concept of explanation so that a fact can be explained either derivationally, by the premises which lead to it, or systemically, by the consequences which follow from it.  With derivational explanation, a fact t is explained when it is subsumed by some prior, more fundamental fact t.  With systemic explanation, t is explained when it is a "best fit" for its consequences, where fitness is measured by uniformity, simplicity, connectedness, and other criteria conducive to systemic integration.  Rescher concludes that while a theory of everything cannot be explained derivationally (since no deeper explanation can subsume it), it can be explained systemically by its capacity to integrate its consequences.

In his 1996 book The Conscious Mind, David Chalmers argues that a theory of everything must explain consciousness, that consciousness does not logically supervene on the physical, and that therefore a fundamental theory in physics would not be a theory of everything.  A truly final theory, he argues, needs not just physical properties and laws, but phenomenal or protophenomenal properties and psychophysical laws explaining the relationship between physical processes and conscious experience.  He concludes that "[o]nce we have a fundamental theory of consciousness to accompany a fundamental theory in physics, we may truly have a theory of everything."  Developing such a theory will not be straightforward, he says, but "it ought to be possible in principle."

In "Prolegomena to Any Future Philosophy", a 2002 essay in the Journal of Evolution and Technology, Mark Alan Walker discusses modern responses to the question of how to reconcile "the apparent finitude of humans" with what he calls "the traditional telos of philosophy—the attempt to unite thought and Being, to arrive at absolute knowledge, at a final theory of everything."  He contrasts two ways of closing this "gap between the ambitions of philosophy, and the abilities of human philosophers": a "deflationary" approach in which philosophy is "scaled down into something more human" and the attempt to achieve a theory of everything is abandoned, and an "inflationary", transhumanist approach in which philosophers are "scaled up" by advanced technology into "super-intelligent beings" better able to pursue such a theory.

 Criticism 

In "Holistic Explanation and the Idea of a Grand Unified Theory", originally presented as a lecture in 1998, Rescher identifies two negative reactions to the idea of a unified, overarching theory: reductionism and rejectionism.  Reductionism holds that large-scale philosophical issues can be meaningfully addressed only when divided into lesser components, while rejectionism holds that questions about such issues are illegitimate and unanswerable.  Against reductionism, Rescher argues that explaining individual parts does not explain the coordinating structure of the whole, so that a collectivized approach is required.  Against rejectionism, he argues that the question of the "reason" – the "why" – behind existence is pressing, important, and not obviously meaningless.

 See also 
 Integral theory
 Metaphilosophy
 Systematic philosophy
 Theory of everything (physics)
 Gödel's incompleteness theorems

 References 

 Further reading 
 Richard L. Cartwright, "Speaking of Everything", Noûs'' 28(1) (Mar., 1994), pp. 1–20.

Metaphysical theories